Girkalnis   is a small town in Kaunas County in central Lithuania. As of 2011 it had a population of 877.

History
From July to September 1941, about 1,000 Jews from Raseiniai, Betygala and Girkalnis were massacred in the city. Those mass executions were done by Germans and local policemen in the context of Shoah by bullets.

References

Towns in Lithuania
Towns in Kaunas County
Holocaust locations in Lithuania